K79 or K-79 may refer to:

K-79 (Kansas highway), a state highway in Kansas
HMS Petunia (K79), a former UK Royal Navy ship